The 1999 St Albans City and District Council election took place on 6 May 1999 to elect members of St Albans City and District Council in Hertfordshire, England. The whole council was up for election with boundary changes since the last election in 1998 increasing the number of seats by 1. The Liberal Democrats lost overall control of the council to no overall control.

Election result
Both the Liberal Democrats and Conservatives won 21 seats, while Labour took 16 seats. Boundary changes had increased the number of seats to 58 from 57, with an exact seat in Sandridge ward. The closest result was in Harpenden East, where Conservative Michael Clark won a seat by 3 votes defeating the mayor Brian Peyton. Overall turnout at the election was 37.1%, up from 35.3% at the 1998 election but down from the 39.6% in 1996.

Ward results

By-elections between 1999 and 2000

References

1999
1999 English local elections
1990s in Hertfordshire